Trenella is the sole genus in the Trenellidae, an extinct family of paleozoic Yochelcionellids.

2005 taxonomy 
The taxonomy of the Gastropoda by Bouchet & Rocroi, 2005 categorizes Trenellidae in the superfamilia Yochelcionelloidea within the 
Paleozoic molluscs of uncertain systematic position. This family has no subfamilies.

2006-2007 taxonomy 
According to P. Yu. Parkhaev, the family Trenellidae is in the superfamily Yochelcionelloidea Runnegar & Jell, 1976 within the order Helcionelliformes Golikov & Starobogatov, 1975, subclass Archaeobranchia Parkhaev, 2001, class Helcionelloida Peel, 1991.

Genera 
Genera in the family Trenellidae include:

 Trenella Parkhaev, 2001 - type genus of the family Trenellidae

References

Helcionelloida
Prehistoric invertebrates of Australia
Prehistoric mollusc genera
Protostome enigmatic taxa